Digital paper, also known as interactive paper, is patterned paper used in conjunction with a digital pen to create handwritten digital documents. The printed dot pattern uniquely identifies the position coordinates on the paper. The digital pen uses this pattern to store handwriting and upload it to a computer.

The paper

The dot pattern is a two-dimensional barcode; the most common is the proprietary Anoto dot pattern. In the Anoto dot pattern, the paper is divided into a grid with a spacing of about 0.3 mm, a dot is printed near each intersection offset slightly in one of four directions, a camera in the pen typically records a 6 x 6 groups of dots. The full pattern is claimed to consist of 669,845,157,115,773,458,169 dots, and to encompass an area exceeding 4.6 million km² (this corresponds to 73 trillion unique sheets of letter-size paper).

The complete pattern space is divided into various domains. These domains can be used to define paper types, or to indicate the paper's purpose (for example, memo formatting, personal planners, notebook paper, Post-it notes, et cetera).

The Anoto dot pattern can be printed onto almost any paper, using a standard printing process of at least 600 dpi resolution (some claim a required resolution of 1,000 dpi), and carbon-based black ink. The paper can be any shape or size greater than 2 mm to a side. The ink absorbs infrared light transmitted from the digital pen; the pen contains a receiver that interprets the pattern of light reflected from the paper. Other colors of ink, including non-carbon-based black, can be used to print information that will be visible to the user, and invisible to the pen.

Further reading 
 Signer, Beat: Fundamental Concepts for Interactive Paper and Cross-Media Information Spaces, May 2008, Hardcover, 276 pages,  (10),  (13)
 Signer, Beat and Norrie, Moira C.: Interactive Paper: Past, Present and Future, In Proceedings of PaperComp 2010, 1st International Workshop on Paper Computing, Copenhagen Denmark, September 2010 (Presentation)

References

Computing input devices
Paper
Display technology